Natasha Sharp (born 10 August 1995) is an Australian badminton player who competes in international level events. Her highest achievement is winning a bronze medal at the 2012 Oceania Badminton Championships in the women's doubles. She has also participated at the 2012 BWF World Junior Championships but did not medal.

References

1995 births
Living people
Australian female badminton players
Sportspeople from Sydney